– December 25, 2004) was an American writer and literary critic.  He was an English professor at Temple University in Philadelphia.Josia

Works
 The Sympathetic Alien: James Joyce and Catholicism 1959, New York University Press
 Matters of Style 1968, Bobbs-Merrill Company, Inc.
 The Irrelevant English Teacher 1972, Temple University Press, .
 Prejudice and Literature 1976, Temple University Press,

References

1912 births
2004 deaths
American academics of English literature
American male non-fiction writers
20th-century American male writers